A terrine is a glazed earthenware (terracotta, French terre cuite) cooking dish with vertical sides and a tightly fitting lid, generally rectangular or oval. Modern versions are also made of enameled cast iron.

See also
 List of cooking vessels
 Tureen for the serving dish

References

Cooking vessels
Terracotta